Grand Valley is an unincorporated community within Eldred Township, Warren County, Pennsylvania, United States.

References

Unincorporated communities in Warren County, Pennsylvania
Unincorporated communities in Pennsylvania